"In a Dream" is the second single from Rockell's first album, What Are You Lookin' At? (1998). A music video has never been filmed for the single. "In a Dream" peaked at number 72 on the Billboard Hot 100.

Track listing

 US CD Single

Charts

References

1997 singles
Rockell songs
1997 songs
Songs written by Michael Zager